Riad or Riyad may refer to:

 Riyadh, the capital city of Saudi Arabia
 Riyad, Mauritania
 Riad (name), a given name and surname (including a list of people with the name, also Riyad or Riyadh)
 Riad (architecture), a traditional Moroccan house or palace with an interior garden or courtyard
 Hadith Bayad wa Riyad, an Arabic love tale
 "Riad N' the Bedouins", a song by Guns N' Roses from their 2008 album Chinese Democracy
 Radiation and Isotope Applications Division, a research division of the Pakistan Institute of Nuclear Science and Technology
 ES EVM, a series of clones of IBM's System/360 and System/370 mainframes, released in the Comecon countries under the initiative of the Soviet Union since the 1960s